Harold Taylor (March 28, 1926 – November 16, 2009) was a professional ice hockey player who played 66 games in the National Hockey League with the Toronto Maple Leafs and Chicago Black Hawks between 1946 and 1952, winning the Stanley Cup in 1949 with Toronto. The rest of his career, which lasted from 1944 to 1958, was spent in the minor leagues. Taylor was born in St. James, Manitoba in 1926 and died in Sidney, British Columbia 2009.

Career statistics

Regular season and playoffs

Awards and achievements
 Memorial Cup Championship (1946)
 Stanley Cup Championship (1949)
 Calder Cup (AHL) Championship (1951)
 Honoured Member of the Manitoba Hockey Hall of Fame

External links
 
 Harry Taylor’s biography at Manitoba Hockey Hall of Fame

1926 births
2009 deaths
Buffalo Bisons (AHL) players
Canadian ice hockey centres
Chicago Blackhawks players
Cleveland Barons (1937–1973) players
Ottawa Senators (QSHL) players
Pittsburgh Hornets players
Providence Reds players
St. James Canadians players
St. Louis Flyers players
Ice hockey people from Winnipeg
Stanley Cup champions
Toronto Maple Leafs players
Tulsa Oilers (USHL) players
Winnipeg Monarchs players